Elena Ierodiakonou (born c. 1982) is a Greek Cypriot model and beauty contestant.  She won the Miss Star Cyprus title during the Carlsberg Pancyprean Official Beauty Contest in July 2005 and went on to represent Cyprus at the 2006 Miss Universe pageant in Los Angeles, California in July. She was brought up on the small Greek island of Kalymnos, near the seaside, where she used to swim every day. Her family moved back to Cyprus when she was eight. She describes herself as having the ability to see the positive view of every difficult situation.

External links
 Diva Models

1985 births
Living people
Cypriot schoolteachers
Greek Cypriot people
Miss Universe 2006 contestants
Cypriot beauty pageant winners
People from Kalymnos